"Chuck Versus the Predator" is the seventeenth episode of the second season of Chuck. It originally aired on March 23, 2009. Chuck Bartowski reluctantly tells his handlers that he has been contacted by Orion, the mastermind behind the Intersect computer and the person who can erase the Intersect from his brain. When the team goes to retrieve the computer Orion sent to Chuck, they run into a Fulcrum agent named Vincent (Arnold Vosloo). After Orion's computer is brought back successfully, General Beckman (Bonita Friedericy) arrives in person to oversee the operation to locate Orion. Meanwhile, a conflict breaks out between the Burbank and Beverly Hills Buy More branches.

Plot

Main plot
Chuck Bartowski, John Casey and Sarah Walker return from an assignment involving plumbing. Chuck still longs to find Orion, the chief designer of the Intersect and the only one who could remove it, to return to his civilian life. As he stays up all night reviewing the chart behind the Tron poster (from the previous episode) and searching for Orion on his computer, he notices that the webcam activates. On the other end of the connection, an unknown man in Hong Kong types on a laptop. He then types on a wrist-mounted computer pad and leaves. Suddenly, a group of Fulcrum agents led by Vincent Smith (Arnold Vosloo) arrive, identifying the man as Orion. Suddenly, a missile arrives and destroys the agents.

Later, Orion sends Chuck a message on a computer, revealing his knowledge that Chuck is the Human Intersect. Orion wishes to meet with Chuck and sends him a computer. Chuck promptly informs Sarah, Casey, and General Beckman (Bonita Friedericy), who wants the computer since it is capable of breaking defense computers and hijacking weaponry. Meanwhile, Lester Patel intercepts the computer at the Buy More, believing it to be the new Roark 7 gaming laptop.

At the Buy More, Lester, Morgan Grimes and Jeff Barnes take the advanced laptop. When opened, Orion asks for identification. When they reply that they cannot, Orion assumes that they are in danger and sends a Predator drone from Edwards Air Force Base. Assuming it is a simulation game, they target their own location. Casey detects the drone and prepares to evacuate the building, but the group in the bathroom instead target the Beverly Hills Buy More (See "Buy More"). Chuck realizes that his coworkers have intercepted the laptop and orders Morgan to stop playing with the computer. He finds them in the men's room and enters a target sequence cancel code to abort the aerial support mission. Big Mike walks in on the commotion, assumes that the laptop is the Roark 7, takes it and places it in a safe, assigning Emmett Milbarge (Tony Hale) to guard it overnight. Meanwhile, Vincent reports his discoveries to the Ring Elders and persuades them to let him infiltrate the Burbank Buy More.

As Emmett guards the Buy More, Casey, Chuck and Sarah sneak in to retrieve the laptop. Chuck orders Casey and Sarah to cause a distraction while he inputs the combination to Big Mike's safe, telling them not to use guns or violence. As the agents get into place, Emmett walks past Lester and Jeff, who have their own plan to steal the laptop. As Jeff attempts to throw his voice to distract Emmett, Emmett seeks the source, leading everyone to scatter. As Chuck enters the office, Lester mistakenly scolds Casey (believing him to be Jeff) and Jeff mistakenly talks to Sarah (believing her to be Lester). Suddenly, Vincent enters through the roof to steal the laptop. After Chuck unlocks the safe, he turns around and flashes on a gun-wielding Vincent.

When Jeff and Lester realize that there are other robbers in the store, they flee, only to get maced by Emmett. As Emmett gloats, Casey incapacitates him with an elbow strike. As Sarah joins Casey, Chuck comes out held at gunpoint by Vincent, who demands that they drop their guns. When Chuck explains why his plan excludes guns, Vincent explains that it would be unprofessional not to shoot someone. Casey produces a gun and shoots Vincent first. Before they can question Vincent, he ingests tetrodotoxin.

Casey dumps Vincent's body in Castle. Beckman stops Chuck from opening the laptop, suspecting Orion of being in Fulcrum and taking over the operation personally, warning Chuck that he may have to return with her if Fulcrum knows his identity. When Orion again contacts Chuck and calls his cell phone, Chuck explains that the computer is locked up in a government facility and Orion is suspected of being connected to Fulcrum. Orion tells Chuck to look at the computer and Chuck flashes on a symbol. When Chuck asks how Orion knew that was in the Intersect, he replies that he put it there, fully convincing Chuck.

Orion shows Chuck surveillance of a meeting of Beckman, Sarah and Casey, where Beckman explains that Chuck is too important to national security to allow Orion to remove the Intersect, hence the lie that Orion is connected to Fulcrum. After seeing Sarah agree, Chuck flees, leaving his watch behind. Chuck reaches the laptop, and Orion confirms that he can remove the Intersect. As they arrange a meeting, Vincent crawls out of his body bag and kidnaps Chuck, having been trained to survive tetrodotoxin's near-death state. Meanwhile, Sarah and Casey realize that Chuck has left his apartment and notice the address of his meeting with Orion on a surveillance video.

At the rendezvous, Vincent threatens to kill Chuck's family, forcing Chuck to tell Orion that he is safe. Suddenly, Fulcrum agents surround and capture Orion. As Orion is led to a helicopter on the roof, Sarah and Casey arrive and shoot Vincent. As the helicopter takes off, Chuck opens the laptop and finds that Orion has activated an "Emergency Protocol". Suddenly, the Predator drone arrives and destroys the helicopter, with Orion inside.

After Beckman admits that she does not want the Intersect removed from Chuck's head, Chuck returns home to find a packet containing cards depicting the Intersect and a disc. On the disc, a video of Orion instructs Chuck to study the cards, then self-destructs. Beckman questions Casey about Sarah's reliability and feelings towards Chuck, requesting everything Casey knows about them. Meanwhile, Chuck reviews the cards, determined to return to his old life.

Buy More
The Buy More employees discover their store toilet papered by the employees of the Beverly Hills branch, led by Barclay (Matt Winston). Big Mike reveals that they are jealous that the Burbank branch is getting the new Roark Instruments laptop first. Lester later intercepts Orion's laptop for Chuck, believing it to be the Roark 7. From Jeff's "office" in the men's bathroom, Lester, Jeff, and Morgan command a Predator drone and nearly bomb themselves, believing it to be a simulation game. They then command it to bomb the Beverly Hills branch, but Chuck arrives and cancels the mission just in time. Big Mike walks in on the commotion, presumes that the laptop is the Roark 7, takes it, places it in a safe, and assigns Emmett to guard it overnight.

Jeff and Lester later sneak into the store to steal the laptop, becoming separated. Realizing that they are actually talking to Sarah and Casey, they flee the store. They are then maced by Emmett, who is then incapacitated by Casey. Big Mike and Morgan arrive, and Jeff and Lester lie about overhearing the break-in. Emmett thinks that an entire crew has attacked him, leading everyone to suspect the Beverly Hills branch.

They enter the store to retaliate, and Emmett accidentally causes a chain reaction of shelves tipping over. As they celebrate their victory the next day, the Beverly Hills group enters and accuses them. Big Mike convinces them that involving the police is not "the Buy More way" and the group exits. Mike thanks Morgan and informs him of rumors of a store closing, thus reassuring his de facto stepson that he will not let that happen.

Production

Flashes
Chuck flashes on Vincent at the Buy More
Chuck flashes on the symbol that Orion puts on his computer screen

Cultural references
There are a number of allusions to The Matrix in this episode. Orion's communication with Chuck via computer screens is similar to when Morpheus first contacts Neo in his bedroom, such as when Chuck's search of the Internet is interrupted by Orion. There are some musical clues, such as when Vincent is about to shoot Chuck, and audio clues, as when Chuck opens the laptop sent to him by Orion, that are very similar to the music and sounds used in The Matrix. Chuck's phone conversation with Orion and his plan to escape the agents guarding the area is reminiscent of Neo's conversation with Morpheus at his work. The comic book Chuck appears to read at the end of this episode to hide his Intersect research is titled "Ex Machina" - which is Latin for "out of the machine".

Also, when Big Mike confronts the Beverly Hills Buy More staff after they had broken into the Beverly Hills store, he mimics Sean Connery's speech in the Untouchables.

Emmett compares himself to various gunslingers portrayed in film, including Shane, Matt Dillon and Clint Eastwood.

Orion saying "this disc will self-destruct in five seconds" alludes to the Mission: Impossible franchise, especially the original television series.

When Emmet misses a cardboard cutout of Barclay in the Beverly Hills Buy More he says, "all right, one more time...with feeling," before swinging again. It's a line spoken by Bruce Lee in Enter the Dragon.

Critical response
"Chuck Versus the Predator" received positive reviews from critics. Steve Heisler of The A.V. Club gave the episode an A, though he expressed disappointment that plot points were resolved so quickly. Eric Goldman of IGN gave the episode a 9 out of 10, praising the burglary scene. "From Jeff and Lester mistaking Sarah and Casey for, well, Jeff and Lester; to Emmett spraying mace in Jeff and Lester's face; to Casey revealing he still had a gun on him, despite Chuck telling him not to, this sequence was expertly constructed."

The episode drew 6.156 million viewers.

References

External links
 

Predator
2009 American television episodes